The 1966 season of the Paraguayan Primera División, the top category of Paraguayan football, was played by 9 teams. The national champions were Cerro Porteño.

Results

Standings

References

External links
Paraguay 1966 season at RSSSF

Para
Paraguayan Primera División seasons
Primera